Cratoxylum (or Cratoxylon , an orthographic variant) is a genus of flowering plants in the family Hypericaceae, native to tropical Asia. The generic name is from the Greek meaning "strong wood", referring to the timber.

Description
Cratoxylum species grow as shrubs or small to medium-sized trees. The bark, drying black, produces a yellow resinous sap. The flowers are white or pink to crimson. The ellipsoid fruits consist of three valves.

Distribution and habitat
Cratoxylum species grow naturally from India through southern China to Malesia.

Species
 The Plant List recognises 9 accepted taxa (of species and infraspecific names):
 C. arborescens  
 C. cochinchinense  
 C. formosum  
 C. glaucum  
 C. maingayi  
 C. sumatranum

References

 
Cratoxylum